Dysgonia monogona is a moth of the family Erebidae first described by Oswald Bertram Lower in 1903. It is found in the Australian state of Queensland.

References

Dysgonia